Nauru requires its residents to register their motor vehicles and display vehicle registration plates since 1970. Current plates are Australian standard 372 mm × 134 mm, and use Australian stamping dies.

Nauru